The name Fabio has been used for seven tropical cyclones in the Eastern Pacific Ocean.
 Hurricane Fabio (1982) – A Category 1 hurricane that stayed away from land.
 Hurricane Fabio (1988) – A Category 4 hurricane that passed south of Hawaii but did not affect land.
 Tropical Storm Fabio (1994) – A weak and short lived storm that did not affect land.
 Tropical Storm Fabio (2000) – A weak storm that did not affect land.
 Tropical Storm Fabio (2006) – A short lived storm that did not affect land while tropical, but its remnants affected Hawaii.
 Hurricane Fabio (2012) – A Category 2 hurricane that did not affect land while tropical, but its remnants affected Baja California.
 Hurricane Fabio (2018) – A Category 2 hurricane that became the earliest sixth named storm in the Eastern Pacific on record, never affected land.

See also 
 Cyclone Favio - An alternate spelling of the name which has been used in the Southern Hemisphere.

Pacific hurricane set index articles